Daphne cneorum, the garland flower or rose daphne, is a species of flowering plant in the family Thymelaeaceae, native to the mountains of central and southern Europe. All parts of the plant are poisonous to humans. In cultivation it requires a sheltered position in full sun  or partial shade. It is not completely hardy in exposed locations.

The Latin specific epithet cneorum comes from the Greek and means “like a small olive bush”.

The vigorous cultivar 'Eximia' has gained the Royal Horticultural Society's Award of Garden Merit.

Pests and diseases 

In plant nurseries rose daphnes can be affect by various diseases. One of them is caused by Thielaviopsis basicola and named daphne sudden death syndrome (DSDS). In this disease the plants get black lesions along the roots and then in the two weeks after developing foliar symptoms they die.

References

cneorum
Plants described in 1753
Taxa named by Carl Linnaeus